Euchromia polymena is a species of day flying moth of the subfamily Arctiinae. These moths are vibrantly coloured and look like wasps so known as Wasp moth or Painted handmaiden moth. It was described by Carl Linnaeus in his 1758 10th edition of Systema Naturae. It is found in India and south-eastern Asia, as well as on Sumatra, Java, Sulawesi, Peninsular Malaysia, Borneo and the Philippines. It is also present in the northern part of Western Australia and the Northern Territory.

Description
Hindwings with vein 3 and 4 from angle of cell. Body black. Head with blue spot on the vertex. The frons is white. Tegulae with a white spot. Collar and 1st, 4th and 5th abdominal segments are crimson, whereas 2nd, 3rd, and 6th edged with metallic blue. Forewings with a basal metallic-blue spot and two at end of the cell. There is a large sub-basal, bifid medial and quadrified post-medial orange spots. Hindwing with a trifid basal and quadrified post-medial orange spots. Coxa of forelegs and three spots on pectus are white. Larva reddish with red tubercles. It has long anterior and posterior tufts of hair and shorter dense medial dorsal tufts. Pupa is in a hairy cocoon.

Ecology
The eggs are shiny pale yellow spheres, and laid in groups under a leaf of a food plant. The larvae feed on Ipomoea species. They are orange with bands of black and brown hairs. The caterpillars live in groups until the last instar which is solitary.

References

 

Moths described in 1758
Taxa named by Carl Linnaeus
Euchromiina